Nicolae Gîju (born 4 October 1943) is a Romanian boxer. He competed in the men's bantamweight event at the 1968 Summer Olympics.

References

External links

1943 births
Living people
Romanian male boxers
Olympic boxers of Romania
Boxers at the 1968 Summer Olympics
Sportspeople from Craiova
Bantamweight boxers